ICTV may stand for:

Television programs
 ICTv (Italy), an Italian Web video program focused on technology
 ICTV (TV), a content distribution network for delivering the web-media experience through television
 ICTV (UK), a television service company covering the south of England
 ICTV (Ukraine), a television network of Ukraine
 Indigenous Community Television (see List of Australian television channels)
 Ithaca College Television, the official television production organization of Ithaca College in Ithaca, New York, United States

Other
 International Committee on Taxonomy of Viruses, an organisation that governs the taxonomy of viruses